Abraham David Beame (March 20, 1906February 10, 2001) was an American accountant, investor, and Democratic Party politician who was the 104th mayor of New York City, in office from 1974 to 1977. As mayor, he presided over the city during the 1975 New York City fiscal crisis, when the city was almost forced to declare bankruptcy.

Early life
Beame was born Abraham David Birnbaum in London. His parents were Esther (née Goldfarb) and Philip Birnbaum, Jewish immigrants from Poland who fled Warsaw. Beame and his family left England when he was three months old. He was raised on New York City's Lower East Side.

He graduated from P.S. 160 and the High School of Commerce before enrolling at the City College of New York's School of Business and Civic Administration (later spun off as Baruch College), where he received his undergraduate degree in business with honors in 1928.

Career

Career before politics
While in college, Beame co-founded an accounting firm, Beame & Greidinger. He was an accounting teacher at Richmond Hill High School in Queens from 1929 to 1946 and also taught accounting and commercial law at Rutgers University from 1944 to 1945.

From 1952 to 1961, Beame served as New York City's director of the budget, having also served as assistant director from 1946 to 1952. In this capacity, he "negotiated all city labor contracts without a strike and kept books on city spending and borrowing; he also set up management programs that saved the city $40 million."

Early political career
Beame was a "clubhouse" or machine politician, a product of the Brooklyn wing of the patronage-oriented "regular" Democratic organization, the borough's equivalent of Manhattan's Tammany Hall and the locus of New York patronage politics following the ascent of Meade Esposito, as opposed to the policy-oriented "reform" Democrats who entered New York City politics, most effectively in Manhattan and the Bronx in the 1950s.

Before being elected to two nonconsecutive terms as city comptroller in 1961 and 1969, he was a longstanding member of Crown Heights's influential Madison Democratic Club and served as political boss Irwin Steingut's personal accountant. Members of the Madison Club, including attorney/fundraiser Abraham "Bunny" Lindenbaum and Steingut's son, Stanley, frequently liaised with real estate developer Fred Trump. The club also played a decisive role in the political ascent of Park Slope-based attorney Hugh Carey, whose tenure as governor of New York coincided with Beame's administration, though Carey eventually broke with the organization by endorsing Mario Cuomo's 1977 primary bid to unseat Beame.

In 1965, Beame was the Democratic nominee for mayor of New York City. Edward N. Costikyan was his campaign manager and James Farley his campaign chair. Despite having Senator Robert F. Kennedy's strong support, Beame lost to the Republican nominee, John Lindsay.

Mayor of New York City

Beame won the 1973 Democratic mayoral primary with 34% of the vote, ahead of Herman Badillo (29%), Mario Biaggi (24%), and Albert H. Blumenthal (16%). He defeated State Senator John J. Marchi, Blumenthal, and Biaggi in the 1973 mayoral election, becoming the 104th mayor of New York City.

Fiorello La Guardia—mayor from 1934 to 1945—had a Jewish mother, but Beame was the first mayor of New York City who was an observant Jew. He entered office facing the worst fiscal crisis in the city's history and spent most of his term attempting to ward off bankruptcy. Soon after being sworn in as mayor, Beame slashed the city workforce, froze salaries, and reconfigured the budget, which proved unsatisfactory until reinforced by actions from newly created state-sponsored entities and the granting of federal funds.

In October 1975, the city of New York was in debt of $453 million. Beame made a statement on October 17 that the city had insufficient cash on hand to meet its debt obligations for that day. He added that New York City citizens needed to take immediate steps to protect the city's essential life support systems and to preserve their well-being. President Gerald Ford at first turned down New York's request for a loan, inspiring the legendary Daily News headline "Ford to City: Drop Dead", but Ford later approved federal support for New York.

On the evening of July 13, 1977, a massive power failure hit the city. With temperatures in the mid-nineties Fahrenheit and the humidity high, New Yorkers sweltered. By the time power was restored at 10:39 p.m. the next night, the city had been without power for 25 hours. Beame set up a Blackout Action Center at the New York City Police Department headquarters. The blackout resulted in raw sewage washing up on beaches and spoiled food in hundreds or thousands of restaurants around the city.

After a chaotic four years as mayor, Beame ran for a second term in 1977, and finished third in the Democratic primary, behind Representative Ed Koch and New York Secretary of State Mario Cuomo, and ahead of former Representative Bella Abzug, Representative Herman Badillo and Manhattan Borough President Percy Sutton. He was succeeded by Koch, who won the general election on November 8, 1977.

When Beame left office on January 1, 1978, the city budget had a surplus of $200 million. There was a $1.5 billion deficit when Beame took office.

A 1993 survey of historians, political scientists and urban experts by Melvin G. Holli of the University of Illinois at Chicago ranked Beame as the 14th-worst American big-city mayor to serve between 1820 and 1993.

Later career
Beame worked in investment advising after leaving office.

Personal life
Beame was 5 ft 2 in (157 cm) tall.

He was married to his childhood sweetheart, Mary (née Ingerman), for 67 years. They met when Beame was 15, playing checkers at University Settlement Society of New York. They raised two sons, Edmond and Bernard (Buddy), and lived in Brooklyn, first in Crown Heights and later in a "modest apartment" on Plaza Street West in Park Slope. Throughout his life, Beame summered in the Rockaway neighborhood of Belle Harbor.

Beame received the Townsend Harris medal in 1957, and awards from numerous charitable, religious and civic organizations.

Beame experienced heart problems in his later years. He had heart attacks in 1991 and 2000. After the second, he was admitted to New York University Medical Center, where he remained for the last months of his life. He underwent open-heart surgery in August and December 2000, and died from surgical complications on February 10, 2001, at the age of 94.

See also
 La Guardia and Wagner Archives
 Timeline of New York City#1950s–1970s

References

External links
 
  (archived)
 

1906 births
2001 deaths
20th-century American Jews
20th-century American businesspeople
20th-century American politicians
American accountants
American investors
American people of Polish-Jewish descent
Baruch College alumni
Burials at New Montefiore Cemetery
Businesspeople from New York City
English emigrants to the United States
English people of Polish-Jewish descent
Jewish American people in New York (state) politics
Jewish mayors of places in the United States
Jews and Judaism in New York City
Mayors of New York City
New York (state) Democrats
New York City Comptrollers
People from Crown Heights, Brooklyn
People from the Lower East Side
People from the Upper East Side
Rutgers University faculty